The Mohawk Mountains is a mountain range in the northwest Sonoran Desert of southwest Arizona. It abuts the western Gila River valley to the north (the Lower Gila River Valley), and is located in southern Yuma County. The Mohawk Valley lies adjacent and southwest of the range; the San Cristobal Valley is northeast.

The Mohawk Mountains-Bryan Mountains is a northwest–southeast trending block faulted system. Mohawk, Arizona on Interstate 8 is located on the north end of the range; Mohawk Pass traverses the range with the interstate route.

See also 
 Valley and range sequence-Southern Yuma County
 List of mountain ranges of Yuma County, Arizona

References

Mountain ranges of the Sonoran Desert
Mountain ranges of Yuma County, Arizona
Mountain ranges of Arizona